The Imperial German General Government of Belgium was a German Army occupation administration which administered one of the three separate occupation zones established in German-occupied Belgium during the First World War.

Government and administration
The General Government was set up on 26 August 1914, when Field Marshal Colmar Freiherr von der Goltz was appointed as military governor of Belgium. He was succeeded by General Moritz von Bissing on 27 November 1914.

Soon after Bissing's appointment, the German High Command divided Belgium into three distinct administrative zones. The largest of the zones was the General Government, which included Brussels, the capital, and most of central and eastern Belgium. The second zone, under the control of the German Fourth Army, included the cities of Ghent and Antwerp and was known as the Etappengebiet ("Staging Area"). The third zone, under the auspices of the German Navy, included all Belgian coastal zones under German occupation and the areas closest to the front-line was called the Operationsgebiet ("Operational Area").

The German occupation tried to keep the pre-war Belgian administrative system as intact as possible and guide it using a small group of German officers and officials with adequate linguistic and administrative skills.

The occupation pushed to the breaking point what few constraints international law then imposed on an occupying power. A heavy-handed German military administration sought to regulate every detail of daily life, both on a personal level with travel restraints and collective punishment as on the economical level by harnessing the Belgian industry to the German advantage and by levying repetitive massive indemnities on the Belgian provinces. Among the measures of the German administration was to shift Belgium from Greenwich Mean Time to Central European Time. Before the war, Belgium was the sixth largest economy in the world; but the Germans destroyed the Belgian economy so thoroughly by dismantling industries and transporting the equipment and machinery to Germany that it never regained its pre-war level. More than 100,000 Belgian workers were forcibly deported to Germany to work in the war industry and to Northern France to build roads and other military facilities to the German military's benefit.

The German High Command hoped to exploit the ethnic tension between the Flemings and Walloons, and envisioned a post-war German protectorate in Flanders, while Wallonia was to be used for industrial materials and labour along with much of northeastern France.

In April 1917 Von Bissing died and he was succeeded by Ludwig von Falkenhausen.

Military Governors-General

See also
Government General of Warsaw
Von Bissing University
Raad van Vlaanderen (World War I)
Flamenpolitik

References

Citations

External links
Generalgouvernement Belgien at 1914-1918 Online Encyclopedia.

 
German Empire in World War I
Politics of World War I
States and territories established in 1914
Western Front (World War I)